The Israel Whitney House is a historic house in Needham, Massachusetts. It is a -story wood-frame house, five bays wide, with a side gable roof and clapboard siding. Its front facade is symmetrical, with a center entrance flanked by sidelight windows and pilasters, and a corniced entablature on top. The house was built in 1830 by Israel Whitney, who had married Mary Fuller, a descendant of one of Needham's early settlers. Whitney had purchased the land on which the house was built in 1829. Whitney was a shoemaker and active in local politics, holding a variety of offices.

In the 1940s, the house was sold to Elizabeth D. Revere, the wife of a distant relative of Paul Revere.

The house was listed on the National Register of Historic Places in 1988.

See also
National Register of Historic Places listings in Norfolk County, Massachusetts

References

Houses in Needham, Massachusetts
Houses on the National Register of Historic Places in Norfolk County, Massachusetts
Houses completed in 1830